Nina Mjøberg (born 18 April 1964) is a Norwegian politician for the Labour Party.

She served as a deputy representative to the Parliament of Norway from Buskerud during the terms 1989–1993, 2005–2009 and 2009–2013.

On the local level, she is a former deputy mayor of Modum.

References

1964 births
Living people
People from Modum
Deputy members of the Storting
Labour Party (Norway) politicians
Buskerud politicians
Women members of the Storting